Brochet is an unincorporated community located in Northern Manitoba on the northern shore of Reindeer Lake near the Saskatchewan border; it is designated as a northern community.

There is no year-round road service to the mostly Cree population. A winter road is in place only a few months a year. Air service at Brochet Airport is the main link outside the community. It takes roughly one hour to reach Brochet from Thompson, Manitoba, by air, and approximately 4 to 6 hours via winter road from Lynn Lake, depending on road conditions.

In Northern Manitoba, there are a few unincorporated communities aside from Brochet, such as Granville Lake and South Indian Lake. There are also several First Nations and Aboriginal communities, such as: Barren Lands First Nation, Northlands First Nation, Sayisi Dene, Split Lake Cree, Fox Lake, Shamattawa, and Mathias Colomb.

History 

Founded as a Hudson's Bay Company trading post and Roman Catholic mission, the community was originally called Fort du Brochet, first appearing on maps in 1883. The community's name was shortened in 1924 to Brochet, which is the French name of the northern pike, commonly known in Manitoba as the "jackfish."

Brochet's Cree inhabitants historically ranged over a wide area, and in the fur trade era, other trading posts once competed for their business. Nearby locations of this type include Le Pensie, also known as Sandy Hills, which closed in 1930.

Climate 
The climate of Brochet is extremely variable. The hottest temperature ever recorded was 33.5 C on August 11, 1991, and the lowest -51.7 C on February 15, 1966.

Demographics 

Adjoining Brochet is the territory of the Barren Lands First Nation, called Broshit 197.
These two communities, Brochet 197 with 547 residents and Brochet with 146 residents,
form a population centre of 693 people also called Brochet.

See also 
 Lac Brochet, Manitoba, (a community on Lac Brochet north of Reindeer Lake)

References 

Designated places in Manitoba
Northern communities in Manitoba
Indian reserves in Manitoba